The 1995–96 NBA season was the Spurs' 20th season in the National Basketball Association, and 29th season as a franchise. San Antonio hosted the 1996 NBA All-Star Game. During the off-season, the team signed free agents Carl Herrera, who previously won two championships with the Houston Rockets, former Spurs center Greg Anderson, and three-point specialist Brad Lohaus. Without Dennis Rodman, who was dealt to the Chicago Bulls in exchange for Will Perdue during the off-season, the Spurs had a solid team chemistry led by reigning MVP David Robinson and Sean Elliott, who were both selected for the All-Star Game. The team got off to a solid 11–4 start, holding a 31–14 record at the All-Star break. At midseason, they traded Lohaus and J.R. Reid to the New York Knicks in exchange for Charles D. Smith and second-year forward Monty Williams. The Spurs posted a 17-game winning streak in March, where they went undefeated posting a 16–0 record, which matched the 1971–72 Los Angeles Lakers' record. The Spurs went on to win their second straight Midwest Division title with a 59–23 record.

Robinson averaged 25.0 points, 12.2 rebounds, 1.4 steals and 3.3 blocks per game, and was named to the All-NBA First Team and NBA All-Defensive Second Team. In addition, Elliott averaged 20.0 points and 5.1 rebounds per game, while Vinny Del Negro provided the team with 14.5 points per game, and Avery Johnson provided with 13.1 points, 9.6 assists and 1.5 steals per game. Off the bench, sixth man and three-point specialist Chuck Person contributed 10.9 points per game, and led the team with 190 three-point field goals, and Perdue averaged 5.2 points and 6.1 rebounds per game. Robinson also finished in second place in Most Valuable Player voting, and in fourth place in Defensive Player of the Year voting, while head coach Bob Hill finished tied in third place in Coach of the Year voting.

In their seventh consecutive trip to the playoffs, the Spurs would easily beat the Phoenix Suns in four games in the Western Conference First Round. However, in the Western Conference Semi-finals, the Spurs would again stumble in the postseason losing to Karl Malone, John Stockton and the 3rd-seeded Utah Jazz in six games, including a 108–81 road loss in Game 6. Following the season, Doc Rivers retired to become a broadcast analyst for Turner Sports, ending his 13-year career in the NBA.

A notable highlight of the season was the Spurs defeating the expansion Vancouver Grizzlies, 111–62 at the Alamodome on November 8, 1995. Vancouver's 62 points were the fifth-lowest amount of points scored in a game in NBA history at the time.

Draft picks

Roster

Regular season

Season standings

z – clinched division title
y – clinched division title
x – clinched playoff spot

Record vs. opponents

Game log

Playoffs

|- align="center" bgcolor="#ccffcc"
| 1
| April 26
| Phoenix
| W 120–98
| Vinny Del Negro (29)
| Will Perdue (9)
| Avery Johnson (18)
| Alamodome16,545
| 1–0
|- align="center" bgcolor="#ccffcc"
| 2
| April 28
| Phoenix
| W 110–105
| David Robinson (40)
| David Robinson (21)
| Avery Johnson (15)
| Alamodome19,507
| 2–0
|- align="center" bgcolor="#ffcccc"
| 3
| May 1
| @ Phoenix
| L 93–94
| David Robinson (22)
| Will Perdue (9)
| Vinny Del Negro (8)
| America West Arena19,023
| 2–1
|- align="center" bgcolor="#ccffcc"
| 4
| May 3
| @ Phoenix
| W 116–98
| David Robinson (30)
| David Robinson (13)
| Avery Johnson (13)
| America West Arena19,023
| 3–1
|-

|- align="center" bgcolor="#ffcccc"
| 1
| May 7
| Utah
| L 75–95
| David Robinson (29)
| Will Perdue (7)
| Avery Johnson (5)
| Alamodome15,112
| 0–1
|- align="center" bgcolor="#ccffcc"
| 2
| May 9
| Utah
| W 88–77
| David Robinson (24)
| David Robinson (12)
| Avery Johnson (10)
| Alamodome18,635
| 1–1
|- align="center" bgcolor="#ffcccc"
| 3
| May 11
| @ Utah
| L 75–105
| Sean Elliott (17)
| David Robinson (9)
| Avery Johnson (10)
| Delta Center19,911
| 1–2
|- align="center" bgcolor="#ffcccc"
| 4
| May 12
| @ Utah
| L 86–101
| Sean Elliott (22)
| Chuck Person (6)
| Avery Johnson (8)
| Delta Center19,911
| 1–3
|- align="center" bgcolor="#ccffcc"
| 5
| May 14
| Utah
| W 98–87
| David Robinson (24)
| David Robinson (15)
| Sean Elliott (8)
| Alamodome34,215
| 2–3
|- align="center" bgcolor="#ffcccc"
| 6
| May 16
| @ Utah
| L 81–108
| Del Negro, Robinson (17)
| David Robinson (8)
| Avery Johnson (8)
| Delta Center19,911
| 2–4
|-

Player statistics

Season

Playoffs

Awards and records
David Robinson, NBA All-Star
David Robinson, All-NBA First Team
David Robinson, NBA All-Defensive First Team
Sean Elliott, NBA All-Star

Transactions

References

See also
1995–96 NBA season

San Antonio Spurs seasons
San Antonio
San Antonio
San Antonio